Crimson is a fantasy-horror vampire comic book series created from artist Humberto Ramos and writer Brian Augustyn, from story concepts by Francisco Haghenbeck and Oscar Pinto.

Publication history
The series debuted in 1998 and ran for twenty-four issues. The first seven issues were published as part of the Image Comics' Cliffhanger imprint of creator-owned comics and then the final seventeen at DC Comics' Wildstorm imprint.

Also published were a Crimson Sourcebook special issue as well as a one-shot starring Scarlet X. Scarlet X - Blood on the Moon was set in Mexico and featured the origin of Joe the Indian.

Plot
Crimson revolves around a young man named Alex Elder who is attacked by a gang of vampires while out late with his friends. Bitten, Alex is saved by Ekimus, the last of an ancient race pre-dating humanity, who claims Alex is "The Chosen One." Alex becomes the first and last of his kind, gaining powers beyond that of a normal vampire, who is destined to bring the end to vampirekind. The series follows Alex as he adjusts to life as a vampire and shoulders the responsibilities of being a hero. The comic features not only vampires, but werewolves and other supernatural beings and elements, as well as Biblical themes and deities.

Main characters
 Alex Elder - the protagonist. A sixteen-year-old teenager who on a night out with friends is ambushed by a savage vampire gang. He is saved by Ekimus, who feeds Alex his blood and turns him into "The Chosen One": a vampire endowed with magical powers so as to destroy all other vampires, and who is chronicled to save the world from the coming apocalypse.
 Ekimus - a wise, repentant, and ancient being known as a "Grigori", who guides Alex in his new life as a vampire. He is known as the source of all vampirism throughout the world.
 Scarlet Thinbault X - a female operative and daughter of "The Order of the Red Hood"; a family-led organisation dedicated to hunting and destroying demonic creatures. She befriends Alex and later becomes his love interest. 
 José - nicknamed "Joe". A Mexican Indian vampire who becomes Alex's street mentor and best friend.
 Lisseth - the main antagonist, and Ekimus' former lover. She is coined "The Mother of All Vampires", bent on bringing about the apocalypse and ruling all of creation. 
 Victor Van Fleet - a U.S. senator and powerful vampire lord with aspirations for the presidency. He is allied with Lisseth.

Collected editions
The series has been collected by DC Comics into four trade paperbacks:

 Crimson:
Loyalty and Loss (collects #1–6, 160 pages, June 1999)
Heaven & Earth (collects #7–12, 160 pages, February 2000)
Earth Angel (collects #13–18, 160 pages, March 2001)
Redemption (collects #19–24, 160 pages, October 2001)

The whole series has also been collected in hardcover:

The Complete Crimson (collects #1–24 as well as Crimson: Scarlett X Blood on the Moon, and the Crimson Sourcebook, 640 pages, August 2018)

Other media

Toys
Palisades Toys released toys based on the series.

References

1998 comics debuts
DC Comics vampires